Madhavan Mukund is the Director and a professor of computer science at Chennai Mathematical Institute, a research and education institute in Chennai, India. He has served as President of Indian Association for Research in Computing Science (IARCS) from 2011 to 2017 and President of Association for Computing Machinery (India Council) from 2016 to 2018.  He was elected Fellow of the Indian Academy of Sciences in 2018. He has been the National Coordinator of the Indian Computing Olympiad since 2001.

He did his B.Tech. in Computer Science and Engineering at Indian Institute of Technology, Bombay in 1986, and his PhD in Computer Science at Aarhus University in Denmark in 1992.

His research interests include models for concurrent and distributed systems, formal verification and distributed algorithms.

References

External links
 Personal website

Year of birth missing (living people)
Living people
Indian computer scientists
Aarhus University alumni
IIT Bombay alumni
Place of birth missing (living people)